Olaf Hense (born 19 November 1967, in Dortmund) is a retired German hurdler.

He competed at the 1991 World Championships and the 1992 Summer Olympics without reaching the final. He won a bronze medal in the 4 x 400 metres relay at the 1993 World Championships, with teammates Rico Lieder, Karsten Just and Thomas Schönlebe.

His personal best time was 48.48 seconds, achieved in June 1993 in Rome. This ranks him second on the German all-time list, only behind Harald Schmid. Hense represented the sports club LG Olympia Dortmund.

References

External links

1967 births
Living people
German male hurdlers
Athletes (track and field) at the 1992 Summer Olympics
Olympic athletes of Germany
Sportspeople from Dortmund
World Athletics Championships medalists
20th-century German people
21st-century German people